Velukandakiya is considered one of the two standard-bearer lay female disciples of the Buddha, the other being Khujjuttara. She is known as the mother of Nanda (not the stepbrother of Buddha with the same name). She is praised as the standard bearer lay female disciple in Samyutta Nikaya17.24, Only daughter.

"Dear, you should become like Khujjuttara the lay follower and Velukandakiya Nanda's mother – for this is the standard and criterion for my female disciples who are lay followers, that is Khujjuttara the lay follower and Velukandakiya, Nanda's mother.

Disciples of Gautama Buddha
Buddhism and women